Raymond Randall Dovey (18 July 1920 – 27 December 1974), known as Ray Dovey, was an English cricketer who played for Kent County Cricket Club from 1938 to 1954.

Dovey was born in Chislehurst in Kent in 1920 and first played for Kent before the Second World War as an off-break bowler. He made his debut for Kent's Second XI in 1936 before making his first-class cricket debut in 1938 against Surrey at Rectory Field, Blackheath. He played for Kent until 1954, making a total of 249 appearances for the Kent First XI either side of the war. Dovey was awarded his county cap in 1946 and was used as a "stock bowler" by Kent. He has been described as a "more than useful off-spinner" who was "reliable".

As well as spinning the ball he could also bowl effective medium-pace deliveries and turned the ball sharply, especially on damp pitches. Dovey took career best bowling figures of eight wickets for 23 runs on such a pitch in 1950 against Surrey, taking 102 wickets for Kent during the season.

Dovey toured India and Ceylon with a Commonwealth cricket team in 1950–51, playing in 10 first-class matches on the tour, and took a total of 777 first-class wickets in his career. He played non-first-class matches for Glamorgan sides during the war and made his final first class appearance for Kent against the touring Pakistanis in August 1954.

After retiring from first-class cricket Dovey coached cricket at Sherborne School in Dorset, playing Minor Counties Championship cricket for Dorset County Cricket Club from 1955 to 1959. He made 57 Championship appearances for the county side before returning to Kent to work at Tonbridge School where he was involved with developing young cricketers including Christopher Cowdrey. Dovey died suddenly at Tunbridge Wells in Kent in December 1974 aged 54.

References

External links

1920 births
1974 deaths
English cricketers
Kent cricketers
North v South cricketers
Dorset cricketers
East of England cricketers
Commonwealth XI cricketers